Parfitt may refer to:

 Andy Parfitt (born 1958), British businessman
 Bill Parfitt, British businessman
 Clarence Parfitt (born 1944), Bermudian and Scottish cricketer
 Chris Parfitt, American guitarist
 Cyril Parfitt (1914–2011), British artist
 David Parfitt (born 1958), film producer and actor
 Fred Parfitt (1869–1953), Welsh rugby player
 Harold Parfitt (Panama Canal) (1921–2006), Governor of the Panama Canal Zone, 1975-1979
 Harold Parfitt (Scouting) (1881–?)
 Jade Parfitt (born 1978), British model and presenter
 Judy Parfitt (born 1935), English actress
 Peter Parfitt (born 1936), English cricketer
 Rick Parfitt (1948–2016), English musician
 Robin Parfitt (1946–2006), English educator
 Thomas Parfitt (1911–1984), bishop of Madagascar
 Tudor Parfitt (born 1944), British historian, broadcaster and adventurer

See also
 Parfit
 Parfait
 Parlett